Eupithecia sutiliata is a moth in the family Geometridae. It is found in south-eastern Russia and Mount Chelmos in Greece. It is also found in Iran.

References

Moths described in 1876
sutiliata
Moths of Europe
Moths of Asia